Luigy Gershwin van Jaarsveld (born ) is a South African rugby union player who plays for the Eastern Province Elephants in the Currie Cup. His regular position is eighth man.

References

South African rugby union players
Living people
1996 births
People from Cradock, Eastern Cape
Rugby union number eights
Blue Bulls players
Free State Cheetahs players
Eastern Province Elephants players
Rugby union players from the Eastern Cape
Rugby sevens players at the 2014 African Youth Games